Athenais was a prophetess from Erythrae in Ionia, Asia Minor. She lived at the time of Alexander the Great.  According to Strabo, Athenais was one of the oracles which claimed divine descent for Alexander the Great.

References

Seers of Alexander the Great
4th-century BC Greek women
4th-century BC clergy
Year of birth unknown
Year of death unknown
Female religious leaders